Mauro Sarmiento (born August 10, 1983) is an Italian martial artist. He was born in Casoria, Italy, and represented Italy in Taekwondo at the 2008 Summer Olympics – Men's 80 kg, and won the silver medal, upsetting two-time Olympic champion Steven López of the United States in the quarterfinals. In the gold medal round he lost to Hadi Saei.

At the 2012 Summer Olympics, he won the bronze medal in the men's -80 kg taekwondo event, losing to Nicolas Garcia in the semi-finals, and then beating Nesar Ahmad Bahawi in his bronze medal match.

References 

1983 births
Living people
Italian male taekwondo practitioners
Olympic taekwondo practitioners of Italy
Taekwondo practitioners at the 2008 Summer Olympics
Taekwondo practitioners at the 2012 Summer Olympics
Olympic bronze medalists for Italy
Olympic silver medalists for Italy
Sportspeople from the Province of Naples
Olympic medalists in taekwondo
Medalists at the 2012 Summer Olympics
Medalists at the 2008 Summer Olympics
Universiade medalists in taekwondo
Universiade silver medalists for Italy
Universiade bronze medalists for Italy
Taekwondo practitioners of Gruppo Sportivo Esercito
European Taekwondo Championships medalists
Medalists at the 2005 Summer Universiade
Medalists at the 2007 Summer Universiade
20th-century Italian people
21st-century Italian people